Tah Brian Anunga (born August 10, 1996) is a Cameroonian professional footballer who plays as a midfielder for Nashville SC in Major League Soccer.

Career

Professional

Wilmington Hammerheads
Anunga joined United Soccer League club Wilmington Hammerheads on 29 April 2015.

Carolina Dynamo
Anunga joined Carolina Dynamo of USL League 2.

Charleston Battery
On 16 March 2017, Anunga joined United Soccer League Club Charleston Battery. Anunga was voted the club's most valuable player and made the USL All-League First Team in 2018.

Nashville SC
On 15 January 2020, Anunga joined Major League Soccer expansion side Nashville SC ahead of the 2020 season.

International
Anunga has represented Cameroon at the U17, U20 and U23 levels while being a captain at the U20 level.

References

External links
MLS Bio
Nashville SC Bio

Living people
Cameroonian footballers
Cameroonian expatriate footballers
Wilmington Hammerheads FC players
North Carolina Fusion U23 players
Charleston Battery players
Nashville SC players
Association football midfielders
Expatriate soccer players in the United States
USL Championship players
USL League Two players
1996 births
Major League Soccer players